Lashkar Bridge-Dam, is a world heritage site, a part of Shushtar Historical Hydraulic System, located in the island city Shushtar, Khouzestan, Iran from the Achaemenid era. Lashkar Bridge was registered on UNESCO's list of World Heritage Sites in 2009 and is Iran's 10th cultural heritage site to be registered on the United Nations' list together with the 12 other historical bridges, dams, canals, and buildings as Shushtar Historical Hydraulic System.

Sources 

Bridges in Iran
Buildings and structures in Khuzestan Province